The funiculaire du pic du Jer, or Pic du Jer funicular, is a funicular railway in the French département of Hautes-Pyrénées. It links the pilgrimage town of Lourdes with the summit of the nearby Pic du Jer. The funicular was constructed in 1900.

The funicular has the following technical parameters:

Length: 
Height: 
Maximum steepness: 56 %
Configuration: Single track with passing loop
Journey time: 15 minutes
Capacity: 80 passengers per car

See also 
 List of funicular railways

References

Coordinates:
Lower station: 
Upper station: 

Pic du Jer, Funiculaire du
Buildings and structures in Hautes-Pyrénées
Metre gauge railways in France
Transport in Occitania (administrative region)
Tourist attractions in Hautes-Pyrénées
Railway lines opened in 1900